The Stéphane Diagana athletics Hall or Lyon Duchère athletics Hall is an indoor stadium of athletics located in the quarter of :fr:La Duchère near the Stadium of La Duchère in Lyon, France. Opened in October 2012 it was inaugurated on 9 November 2012. It is named after the French athlete Stéphane Diagana.

In 2015, the hall was the reception point of the World Masters Athletics Championships taking place in different places in the city of Lyon and bringing together nearly 800 athletes from 114 different countries.

Construction 
The hall was designed by the architectural firm Chabanne & Partenaires and project management was provided by City of Lyon. Manufacturers and service providers were: Ephren Engineering for the structure, Tecsol for solar energy and Terao for high environmental quality. In terms of energy, 69% of energy needs are assured by the use of renewable energy. Building dimensions of 120m by 70m by 15m

The overall cost was estimated at 12.8 million euros duty-free. With taxes included, the cost was 25 million euros paid by: the city of Lyon (38%), the region Rhône-Alpes (26%), the Grand Lyon (12%), the department Rhône (12%), the National Agency for Urban Renewal (6%) and the national center for the development of sport (6%). In 2006, the budget forecast was announced at around 18 million euros.

Description 
The total area is 11,700m2 for a footprint of 7,800m2. The field for athletics itself has a surface 6,400m2 

The 60 meters sprint track has eight lanes and the (circular)track of 200 meters has six lanes The hall has areas dedicated to Long jump, high jump, Pole vault and shot put

Inauguration 
The hall was inaugurated on 9 November 2012 in the presence of Stéphane Diagana, the Minister for Sport Valérie Fourneyron, Gérard Collomb as the mayor of Lyons, Jean-Jack Queyranne as President of the Regional Council and Michel Mercier as President of the Rhône department. The athletics meeting organized on this occasion, featured both Renaud Lavillenie and Christophe Lemaitre

In January 2012, An elected official of Lyon, Nathalie Perrin-Gilbert, expressed his preference for another name to baptize the sports arena; in this case the Lyon vaulter Pierre Quinon.

Competitions welcomed 
 February 2013   : French University athletics championships.
 March 2013   : Cadets and Junior France athletics championships.
 February 2014   : Disabled France Athletics Championships in disabled.
 January 2015   : Interregional athletics championships.
 August 2015   : World Masters Athletic Championships.

References

External links 
 "Photographs of the Hall and of its construction", (the site of the athletic committee of Rhône)
 "Halle Stéphane-Diagana", at pss-archi.eu
 La halle at website of Chabanne & Partenaires

9th arrondissement of Lyon
Athletics (track and field) venues in France
Sports venues completed in 2012
Sports venues in Lyon
21st-century architecture in France